Ney is a surname which may refer to:

Arts and entertainment
 Alexander Ney (born 1939), American painter and sculptor
 Casimir Ney, pseudonym of French composer and violinist Louis-Casimir Escoffier (1801–1877)
 Elisabet Ney (1833–1907), German-American sculptor
 Elly Ney (1882–1968), German pianist
 Francisco de Paula Ney (1858–1897), Brazilian poet and journalist
 Marie Ney (1895–1981), British actress
 Nora Ney, Brazilian singer born Iracema de Sousa Ferreira (1922–2003)
 Richard Ney (1916–2004), American actor and investment counselor

Politics and military
 Bob Ney (born 1954), former U.S. Congressman convicted of corruption
 Camille Ney (1919–1984), Luxembourgian politician
 Frank Ney (1919–1992), Canadian politician
 Hubert Ney (1892–1984), German politician, Minister-President of Saarland
 Michel Ney (1769–1815), Marshal of France under Napoleon
 Napoléon Joseph Ney, 2nd Prince de la Moskowa (1803–1857), French politician, elder son of Michel Ney

Other
 Edward P. Ney (1920–1996), American physicist
 Martin Ney (born 1970), German serial killer
 Rick Ney (born 1961), retired American professional darts player